The 1977 NCAA Men's Water Polo Championship was the ninth annual NCAA Men's Water Polo Championship to determine the national champion of NCAA men's college water polo. Tournament matches were played at the Smith Swim Center at Brown University in Providence, Rhode Island during December 1977.

California defeated UC Irvine in the final, 8–6, to win their fourth national title. This was a rematch of the 1973, 1974, and 1975 finals, all won by the Golden Bears.

The leading scorer for the tournament was Scott Schulte from Bucknell (14 goals). Gary Figueroa, from UC Irvine, was named the Most Outstanding Player. An All-Tournament Team, consisting of seven players, was also named.

Qualification
Since there has only ever been one single national championship for water polo, all NCAA men's water polo programs (whether from Division I, Division II, or Division III) were eligible. A total of 8 teams were invited to contest this championship.

Bracket
Site: Smith Swim Center, Providence, Rhode Island

{{8TeamBracket-Consols
| team-width=150
| RD3=First round
| RD4=Championship semifinals
| RD2=Consolation semifinals
| RD5=Championship
| RD5b=Third place
| RD1=Fifth place
| RD1b=Seventh place

| RD3-seed1= | RD3-team1=Stanford | RD3-score1=14
| RD3-seed2= | RD3-team2=Brown | RD3-score2=2
| RD3-seed3= | RD3-team3=UC Irvine  | RD3-score3=14| RD3-seed4= | RD3-team4=Arizona | RD3-score4=7
| RD3-seed5= | RD3-team5=California | RD3-score5=28| RD3-seed6= | RD3-team6=Bucknell | RD3-score6=10
| RD3-seed7= | RD3-team7=Pepperdine | RD3-score7=14| RD3-seed8= | RD3-team8=Loyola–Chicago | RD3-score8=9

| RD4-seed1= | RD4-team1=Stanford | RD4-score1=7
| RD4-seed2= | RD4-team2=UC Irvine | RD4-score2=9
| RD4-seed3= | RD4-team3=California | RD4-score3=11
| RD4-seed4= | RD4-team4=Pepperdine | RD4-score4=10

| RD2-seed1= | RD2-team1=Brown | RD2-score1=6
| RD2-seed2= | RD2-team2=Arizona | RD2-score2=15
| RD2-seed3= | RD2-team3=Bucknell | RD2-score3=9
| RD2-seed4= | RD2-team4=Loyola–Chicago | RD2-score4=13| RD5-seed1= | RD5-team1=UC Irvine | RD5-score1=6
| RD5-seed2= | RD5-team2=California | RD5-score2=8| RD5b-seed1= | RD5b-team1=Stanford | RD5b-score1=10| RD5b-seed2= | RD5b-team2=Pepperdine | RD5b-score2=6

| RD1-seed1= | RD1-team1=Arizona | RD1-score1=14| RD1-seed2= | RD1-team2=Loyola–Chicago | RD1-score2=4

| RD1b-seed1= | RD1b-team1=Brown | RD1b-score1=7
| RD1b-seed2= | RD1b-team2=Bucknell | RD1b-score2=16}}

 All-tournament team Gary Figueroa, UC Irvine (Most outstanding player)'''
Marty Davis, Stanford
John Gansel, Stanford
Mike Loughlin, California
Jim Purcell, California
Kevin Robertson, California
Terry Schroeder, Pepperdine

See also 
 NCAA Men's Water Polo Championship

References

NCAA Men's Water Polo Championship
NCAA Men's Water Polo Championship
1977 in sports in California
December 1977 sports events in the United States
1977